Edward W. Leary also known as Edwin W. Leary (born February 23, 1891) was an American football and basketball coach. He served as the head football coach at the University of Vermont in 1916 and Roanoke College in 1920.  Leary was also the head basketball coach at Roanoke for one season, in 1920–21, tallying a mark of 6–8.

Head coaching record

College football

References

1891 births
Date of death missing
Year of death missing
Basketball coaches from New York (state)
Colgate Raiders football players
Roanoke Maroons football coaches
Roanoke Maroons men's basketball coaches
Vermont Catamounts football coaches
Sportspeople from Ithaca, New York